Caresses is a 1998 film by Ventura Pons, originally titled Carícies in Catalan.

Plot
Barcelona is the scenario for eleven entwined stories sharing the same characters. The movie deals with a variety of intimate relationships, portraying characters who have to experience intense emotions which cannot be materialised in caresses. Connections explored include several different family and romantic relationships across different genders, ages and generations.

A recurring theme is the irony of how difficult communication can be, even when there is close contact. Partial expression, instincts vs. emotions and physical communication all play a part.

Cast
 David Selvas as Home jove
 Laura Conejero as Dona jove
 Julieta Serrano as Dona gran
 Montserrat Salvador as Dona vella
 Agustín González as Home vell
 Naím Thomas (billed as Naïm Thomàs) as Nen 
 Sergi López as Home
 Mercè Pons as Noia
 Jordi Dauder as Home gran
 Roger Coma as Noi
 Rosa Maria Sardà as Dona

Other cast members; Jordi Cercós, Sandra Pascual and Guillermo Pardevila

External links

 Caresses

1998 films
Spanish anthology films
Spanish drama films
Catalan-language films
1998 drama films
Films set in Barcelona
Films directed by Ventura Pons
1990s Spanish films